William Eriksen (4 February 1909 – 10 March 1999) was a Norwegian footballer. He played in one match for the Norway national football team in 1932.

References

External links
 

1909 births
1999 deaths
Norwegian footballers
Norway international footballers
Sportspeople from Skien
Association football forwards
Odds BK players